The Skopje Aqueduct is an aqueduct and archaeological site located in the neighbourhood of Vizbegovo  northwest of central Skopje, North Macedonia. The Skopje Aqueduct is the only aqueduct in Macedonia, and one of three largest and well preserved in the former Yugoslavia along with Diocletianus Aqueduct near Split, Croatia and Bar Aqueduct in Montenegro.

History
The question of when the Skopje Aqueduct was built is unclear. There are three theories:
during the reign of Rome (1st century); according to this theory the aqueduct fed water to Legionary settlement Scupi.
during the reign of Byzantine Empire (reign of Emperor Justinian I); according to this theory, the aqueduct shipped water to the new settlement Justiniana Prima.
during the reign of Ottoman Empire; according to this theory the aqueduct was built in the 16th century for the many Turkish public hamams.

This aqueduct was in use until the eighteenth century.

See also
List of aqueducts in the Roman Empire
List of Roman aqueducts by date
Ancient Roman technology
Roman engineering

Bibliography
 Petrov K, «Akvedukt kraj Skopje i problemot na negovata datiranje», Godisen Zbornik na Filozofski Fakultet, 13 (1962).

References

External links

 Аквадуктот во Скопје, on site utrinski vesnik
 Игор Василевски:Аквадукт Скопје,on site www.architect.mk
 Аквaдукт Скопје ... Akvadukt Skopje ... Aqueduct Skopje on site volanskopje (photos)

Archaeological sites in North Macedonia
Aqueducts in North Macedonia
Buildings and structures in Skopje
Roman aqueducts outside Rome